The respiratory route may refer to:

Airborne disease
A route of administration of drugs, including nasal administration, inhalation and insufflation
Transmission of pathogens via respiratory droplets